

Champions

Major Leagues

World Series: Baltimore Orioles over Cincinnati Reds (4-1); Brooks Robinson, MVP
All-Star Game, July 14 at Riverfront Stadium: National League, 5-4 (12 innings); Carl Yastrzemski, MVP

Other champions
College World Series: USC
Japan Series: Yomiuri Giants over Lotte Orions (4-1)
Big League World Series: Lincolnwood, Illinois
Little League World Series: American, Wayne, New Jersey
Senior League World Series: West Tampa, Florida
Winter Leagues
1970 Caribbean Series: Navegantes del Magallanes
Dominican Republic League: Tigres del Licey
Mexican Pacific League: Tomateros de Culiacán
Puerto Rican League: Leones de Ponce
Venezuelan League: Navegantes del Magallanes

Awards and honors
Baseball Hall of Fame
Lou Boudreau
Earle Combs
Ford Frick
Jesse Haines
Most Valuable Player
Boog Powell (AL)  Baltimore Orioles
Johnny Bench (NL)  Cincinnati Reds
Cy Young Award
Jim Perry (AL)  Minnesota Twins
Bob Gibson (NL)  St. Louis Cardinals
Rookie of the Year
Thurman Munson (AL)  New York Yankees
Carl Morton (NL)  Montreal Expos
Gold Glove Award
Jim Spencer (1B) (AL) 
Davey Johnson (2B) (AL) 
Brooks Robinson (3B) (AL) 
Luis Aparicio (SS) (AL) 
Paul Blair (OF) (AL) 
Mickey Stanley (OF) (AL) 
Ken Berry (OF) (AL)
Ray Fosse (C) (AL) 
Jim Kaat (P) (AL)

Statistical leaders

Major league baseball final standings

American League final standings

National League final standings

Events

January
January 16 – Curt Flood, Gold Glove outfielder of the St. Louis Cardinals, files a civil lawsuit challenging Major League Baseball's reserve clause, a suit that will have historic implications. Flood refused to report to the Philadelphia Phillies after he was traded by the Cardinals three months ago, contending the baseball rule violates federal antitrust laws.
January 17 – The Sporting News names Willie Mays as Player of the Decade for the 1960s.
January 20 – Lou Boudreau is elected to the Hall of Fame by the Baseball Writers' Association of America on 232 of 300 ballots. Ralph Kiner finishes second with 167, 58 votes short.
January 29 - Pitcher Miguel Fuentes, who threw the last pitch for the Seattle Pilots, is shot to death outside of a bar in Loiza, Puerto Rico.

February
February 1 – The Hall of Fame Special Committee on Veterans selects former commissioner Ford Frick and former players Earle Combs and Jesse Haines for enshrinement.
February 19 – Commissioner Bowie Kuhn announces the suspension of Detroit Tigers pitcher Denny McLain, effective April 1, for McLain's alleged involvement in a bookmaking operation. The suspension is indefinite, but will later be set at three months.

March

April
April 1 – The Milwaukee Brewers organization, headed by Bud Selig, purchases the Seattle Pilots franchise for $10,800,000. Although negotiations were conducted over a period of months, it was not until March 31 when a federal bankruptcy judge declared the Pilots bankrupt. Brewers tickets go on sale the next day. Team equipment is shipped to Milwaukee County Stadium, where the Pilots insignia is ripped off of the uniforms, since there is no time for new uniforms to be made.
April 7 : 
Major league baseball returns to Wisconsin after a 4-year absence as the Brewers play their first game in Milwaukee, losing to the California Angels 12–0 before a crowd of 37,237.
Pitcher Dave McNally strikes out 13 in nine innings as the Baltimore Orioles rip the Indians, 8-2, in Opening Day at Cleveland Stadium. The attack is led by Paul Blair, who drives in a pair of runs and scores three times. McNally holds the Indians to two runs on four hits and three walks to get the win. Rookie Roy Foster belts a two-run home run for the only offense for Cleveland.
In Minnesota, left-fielder Brant Alyea leads the Twins over the Chicago White Sox, 12-0.  His 4-for-4 day includes two homers and seven RBI, the latter setting a major league Opening Day record.
April 8 - The Detroit Tigers release outfielder Tom Tresh. Tresh, who had been the AL rookie of the year in 1961, never plays in the majors again. 
April 11 – At Comiskey Park, Danny Walton hits the first two home runs in Milwaukee Brewers history, both two-run shots coming against White Sox starter Billy Wynne. The Brewers win for the first time, 8-4.
April 18 - Nolan Ryan gave up only one hit in the first inning as he set a then New York Mets record by striking up 15 batters in a 7-0 Mets victory over the Philadelphia Phillies at Shea Stadium.
April 22 – The New York Mets' Tom Seaver strikes out 19 San Diego Padres, including the last 10 in succession, in winning 2-1 for the Mets. Mike Corkins takes the loss. In this century, no one had ever struck out 10 in a row, a major league record. Counting the 10 whiffs, the Pads have struck out 29 times in two games, a National League record that will be topped in 1998 when the Houston Astros miss 31 times in two days. Jerry Grote adds one foul fly catch to his 19 putouts via K's.

May
May 10 – Hoyt Wilhelm makes his 1,000th pitching appearance; the first pitcher in history to do so.
May 12 – At Chicago's Wrigley Field, Ernie Banks becomes the 8th member of the 500 home run club, connecting off Atlanta Braves pitcher Pat Jarvis during a 4–3, 11-inning Chicago Cubs win over the Braves. It his also his 1,600th career run batted in. Ex-Cub Frank Secory is umpiring this game, as he was one of the umpires in the 1953 game in which Banks hit his first career home run. Banks' teammate Billy Williams also homer in the 9th inning to tie the game, while Ron Santo's RBI single in the 11th wins it. Atlanta's Rico Carty, meanwhile, has three singles and has hit in 30 consecutive games.
May 17 – In the second game of a double header, Hank Aaron of the Atlanta Braves collected his 3,000 career hit with an infield single as well as his 517th home run off of pitcher Wayne Granger, during a 7–6, 15-inning loss to the Cincinnati Reds, becoming the founding member of the 3000-500 Club. Through the years, Willie  Mays, Eddie Murray, Rafael Palmeiro, Albert Pujols and Alex Rodriguez would join the select club.

June
June 5 – Bert Blyleven makes his major league debut with the Minnesota Twins, and gives up a lead-off home run to Washington Senators outfielder Lee Maye. Blyleven holds on for a 2–1 victory, the first of a 287 wins career that will propel his induction into the Baseball Hall of Fame and Museum.
June 12 – In the first game of a double header at San Diego Stadium, Dock Ellis of the Pittsburgh Pirates no-hits the San Diego Padres 2–0. Years later, Ellis would claim that he was under the influence of LSD during the entire game.
June 8 – Both Major League Baseball players and management agreed to end their labor dispute by settling on a new standard contract. Among the compromises that benefited the players was a raise in the minimum league salary from $10,000 to $12,000 per season.
June 17 – At Candlestick Park, Ernie Banks and Willie Mays become the first members of the 500 home run club to each hit a home run in the same game. In the eighth inning of the Chicago Cubs' game against the San Francisco Giants, Banks hits his 504th career home run, a three-run shot off Giant reliever Mike Davison. Mays then hits his 615th career home run off the Cubs' Ken Holtzman in the bottom half of the same inning. The Cubs defeat the Giants, 6-1.
June 21 – The Detroit Tigers' César Gutiérrez gets seven hits in seven at bats in 12 innings against the Cleveland Indians, setting an American League mark and tying a major league record for most hits in one game.
June 24 :
In a 7-2 loss to the Cleveland Indians in the first game of a doubleheader at Yankee Stadium, New York Yankees pitcher Steve Hamilton gets Indians batter Tony Horton to foul out on a pitch known as the "Folly Floater".
The Cincinnati Reds defeat the San Francisco Giants, 5-4 in the final game that the Reds will play at Crosley Field.
June 26 – Frank Robinson of the Baltimore Orioles hits grand slams in consecutive innings, the fourth and fifth, in a 12-2 victory over the Washington Senators at Robert F. Kennedy Stadium. The same runners are on base both times: Dave McNally on third, Don Buford on second and Paul Blair on first.
June 28 – The Pittsburgh Pirates defeat the Chicago Cubs in both games of a doubleheader, 3-2 and 4-1, in the last two games played at Forbes Field.
June 30 – Riverfront Stadium opens with the Cincinnati Reds losing to the Atlanta Braves, 8-2.

July
July 2 :
Against the New York Yankees at Tiger Stadium, Joe Niekro of the Detroit Tigers has a no-hitter broken up with one out in the ninth on a Horace Clarke single, the only hit Niekro will allow in a 5-0 Tiger victory. This is the third no-hit bid Clarke has broken up in the ninth inning in less than a month; he had foiled bids by Jim Rooker on June 4 and by Sonny Siebert (who had already pitched a no-hitter in ) on June 19.
 John Bateman of the Montreal Expos set a team record with seven runs batted in to pace the Expos to a 13–10 victory over the St. Louis Cardinals. Bateman started his feat with a grand slam in the Expos' six-run first inning.
July 3 – Clyde Wright of the California Angels has a doubly memorable day. In a ceremony before the Angels' game against the Oakland Athletics at Anaheim Stadium, the former star pitcher at Carson-Newman College (with whom he  won an NAIA Baseball World Series title in ) is inducted into the NAIA Hall of Fame. He then no-hits the Athletics 4-0, the first no-hitter in the stadium's history.
July 8 – San Francisco Giants third baseman Jim Ray Hart tied a modern Major League record with six runs batted in during one inning with all coming in the fifth. As a result, Hart slammed a three-run home run and three-run triple in the frame, and eventually completed his feat by hitting for the cycle en route to a 13–0 victory over the Atlanta Braves.
July 14 – At Riverfront Stadium, the National League wins its eighth straight All-Star Game, a  12-inning 5–4 victory. Pete Rose crashes into Cleveland Indians catcher Ray Fosse to score the winning run on Jim Hickman's single. Fosse, who never had the ball, hurts his right shoulder and is taken to the hospital. The game is scoreless until the 6th inning, with the NL limited to three hits in the first eight innings. In the 9th, the NL tees off on Catfish Hunter, driving in three runs to tie. Dick Dietz hits a leadoff home run in the inning. Claude Osteen pitches the 10th for the win, and Carl Yastrzemski of the Boston Red Sox captures the MVP trophy for the American League. This All-Star Game voting was finally returned to the fans as punch-card ballots debuted in major league ballparks across the nation, being the first time since 1958 that the exhibition's squads were not entirely selected by managers, coaches and players.
July 16 – Pittsburgh's Three Rivers Stadium was opened to the public, but the Cincinnati Reds spoiled the party as they beat the Pittsburgh Pirates, 4–3, before a crowd of 48,846. The first hit at Three Rivers Stadium was a single by Pittsburgh's Richie Hebner. The first home run at the new ballpark was hit by Cincinnati's Tony Pérez.
July 18 – Willie Mays of the San Francisco Giants records his 3,000th career hit.
July 20 – At Dodger Stadium, Bill Singer of the Los Angeles Dodgers no-hits the Philadelphia Phillies, 5–0.
July 26 – Johnny Bench of the Cincinnati Reds hit three straight home runs off St. Louis Cardinals pitcher Steve Carlton. On the same day, Orlando Cepeda, of the Atlanta Braves, also connected three consecutive homers in an 8–3 victory over the Chicago Cubs.

August
August 1 – At Atlanta–Fulton County Stadium, Willie Stargell of the Pittsburgh Pirates hits three doubles and two home runs in the Pirates' 20-10 win over the Atlanta Braves. Amazingly, this game was nationally broadcast, and the trivia question early in the game was to name the two players who had gotten five extra-base hits in a game. Bob Robertson also collects five hits for the Pirates, including a home run; not until Andrew McCutchen and Garrett Jones in  will two Pirates collect five hits each in the same game.
August 2 - The Pittsburgh Pirates' Bob Robertson lashed a two-run double and then followed with two 400-foot homers, driving in a total of six runs as the Pirates beat the Atlanta Braves 10-7.
August 11 – Philadelphia's Jim Bunning beats the Houston Astros 6-5 to become the first pitcher to win 100 games in both leagues since Cy Young.

September
September 3 – Billy Williams of the Chicago Cubs asks to be kept out of the lineup, snapping his National League record of 1,117 consecutive games played. His record was broken in 1983 by Steve Garvey.
September 16 – Minnesota Twins pitcher Bert Blyleven strikes out the first six California Angels batters of the game, and ties a major league record.  Blyleven will finish the game with ten strikeouts, but take the 5-1 loss. 
September 21 – At Oakland–Alameda County Coliseum, Vida Blue of the Oakland Athletics no-hits the Minnesota Twins 6-0, the only baserunner coming on Harmon Killebrew's second-inning walk. The no-hitter caps a season that witnesses four no-hitters, all pitched in California-based Major League stadiums; Candlestick Park is the only one of the five not to have a no-hitter pitched in it.
September 22 - The Minnesota Twins scored a 5-3 win over the second place Oakland Athletics to clinched the American League West. The clinching of the West title by the Twins, came on exactly the same date as they clinched last year.
September 27 - There we're no miracles this year for the reigning World Champions New York Mets who in this game stranded 12 men on base and before the largest crowd in Pittsburgh's Three Rivers Stadium history (50,461) The Pittsburgh Pirates clinched the National League East title with a 2-1 victory over the Mets.

October
October 1 : 
Vic Davalillo of the St. Louis Cardinals breaks the National League single-season pinch hitting record and ties the Major League record with his 24th pinch hit of the year.  
The Philadelphia Phillies defeated the Montreal Expos 2-1 in 10 innings in the final game at Shibe Park (Connie Mack Stadium). The occasion was marred by people literally dismantling the stadium while the game was still in progress. A special post-game ceremony — including a helicopter delivery to Veterans Stadium of home plate — was cancelled.
October 15 – For the third time in the 1970 World Series, the Baltimore Orioles overcome a 3–0 deficit to bury the Cincinnati Reds 9–3, and win the World Championship four games to one. Frank Robinson and Merv Rettenmund each homer and drive in two runs. Third baseman Brooks Robinson, the "human vacuum cleaner", easily wins the Series MVP award.

November
November 21 - New York Mets outfielder Tommie Agee became the first non-pitcher to win a Gold Glove in both leagues. The New York flycatcher also won the honor with the Chicago White Sox during his 1966 rookie of the year season.
November 25 – New York Yankees catcher Thurman Munson receives 23 of 24 first-place votes and is named American League Rookie of the Year. Munson batted .302 with six home runs and 53 RBI during the regular season. Cleveland Indians outfielder Roy Foster (.268, 23, 60) is also named on a first place ballot.
November 27 – Pitcher Carl Morton, who posted an 18-11 record with 154 strikeouts and a 3.60 ERA for the last-place Montréal Expos, receives the National League Rookie of the Year Award. Morton beats out Cincinnati Reds outfielder Bernie Carbo, who hit .310 with 21 home runs and 63 RBI.

December
December 1 – The Boston Red Sox trade second baseman Mike Andrews and shortstop Luis Alvarado to the Chicago White Sox in exchange for future Hall of Fame shortstop Luis Aparicio.
December 25 - The Boston Red Sox sign catcher Bo Diaz as an undrafted amateur free agent.

Births

January
January 1 – Gary Wilson
January 2 – Royce Clayton
January 5 – Brian Runge
January 6 – Dan Naulty
January 9 – T. J. Mathews
January 12 – Nigel Wilson
January 14 – Steve Cooke
January 16 – Ron Villone
January 18 – Mike Bertotti
January 19 – Rick Krivda
January 19 – Ricky Pickett
January 20 – Marvin Benard
January 21 – Jeff McCurry
January 23 – Alan Embree
January 23 – Sherman Obando
January 23 – Mark Wohlers
January 26 – Dan Carlson
January 27 – Jessie Hollins
January 31 – Joel Bennett
January 31 – Chris Pritchett

February
February 1 – Edwin Hurtado
February 1 – Joe Vitko
February 4 – John Frascatore
February 5 – Chris Brock
February 6 – Mark Hutton
February 9 – John Burke
February 10 – Alberto Castillo
February 10 – Bobby J. Jones
February 13 – Kevin Stocker
February 14 – Takashi Saito
February 14 – Kelly Stinnett
February 18 – Tyler Green

March
March 4 – John Dettmer
March 4 – Dave Stevens
March 6 – Scott Stahoviak
March 11 – Pedro Castellano
March 13 – Jorge Fábregas
March 14 – Brent Gates
March 16 – Curt Schmidt
March 20 – Will Brunson
March 21 – Rick DeHart
March 24 – Wilson Álvarez
March 27 – Derek Aucoin

April
April 1 – Matt Herges
April 2 – Dennis Hocking
April 2 – Jon Lieber
April 5 – Ryan Karp
April 6 – Tim Belk
April 10 – Rob Butler
April 10 – Al Reyes
April 11 – Sean Bergman
April 11 – Joe Vitiello
April 13 – Ricardo Rincón
April 14 – Steve Avery
April 18 – Rico Brogna
April 18 – Steve Dunn
April 25 – Sean Mulligan
April 27 – Mike Neill
April 28 – Bill Hurst
April 29 – J. R. Phillips

May
May 2 – Joe Crawford
May 5 – Juan Acevedo
May 7 – Brook Fordyce
May 7 – Mark Smith
May 14 – Larry Sutton
May 15 – Scott Watkins
May 16 – Jim Mecir
May 18 – Scott Baker
May 21 – Bryce Florie
May 21 – Tom Martin
May 23 – Ricky Gutiérrez
May 25 – Joey Eischen
May 25 – Luis Ortiz
May 30 – John Courtright
May 31 – Dilson Torres

June
June 2 – Reid Cornelius
June 2 – Mike Kelly
June 5 – Gene Schall
June 11 – Bill Selby
June 12 – Damon Buford
June 20 – Mike Grace
June 23 – Juan Castillo
June 25 – Aaron Sele
June 27 – Jim Edmonds
June 27 – Ricardo Jordan
June 28 – Kevin Polcovich
June 30 – Mark Grudzielanek

July
July 5 – Doug Bochtler
July 11 – Billy Ashley
July 14 – Mark Brandenburg
July 14 – Tim Davis
July 15 – Joey Long
July 16 – William Van Landingham
July 25 – Garey Ingram
July 29 – Todd Dunn
July 29 – Steve Wojciechowski
July 31 – Mike Figga

August
August 4 – Dax Jones
August 7 – Rich Croushore
August 7 – Bruce Dreckman
August 7 – Greg Pirkl
August 7 – Marc Pisciotta
August 9 – Pat Mahomes
August 12 – Jim Schlossnagle 
August 13 – Eddie Gaillard
August 15 – Tony Rodríguez
August 16 – Quinton McCracken
August 18 – Bobby Higginson
August 19 – Jeff Tam
August 21 – Craig Counsell
August 24 – B. J. Waszgis
August 25 – Duff Brumley
August 25 – Doug Glanville
August 27 – Jim Thome

September
September 2 – Sean Lawrence
September 3 – Dave Berg
September 3 – Chad Fox
September 3 – Craig Wilson
September 4 – Luis López
September 5 – Mike Potts
September 9 – Joey Hamilton
September 9 – Dan Miceli
September 12 – Tito Navarro
September 15 – José Zapata
September 16 – Bronswell Patrick
September 16 – Paul Shuey
September 18 – Ozzie Timmons
September 20 – Chris Snopek
September 22 – Mike Matheny
September 24 – Paul Spoljaric
September 25 – Ray Holbert
September 26 – Matt Murray
September 28 – Brian Banks
September 28 – Mike DeJean
September 29 – Gary Haught
September 29 – Joe Hudson

October
October 1 – Massimo Ciaramella
October 2 – Eddie Guardado
October 3 – Roger Bailey
October 3 – Manny Martínez
October 6 – Darren Oliver
October 7 – Tim Unroe
October 8 – David Doster
October 8 – Sandy Martínez
October 8 – Olmedo Sáenz
October 9 – Mike Robertson
October 12 – Tanyon Sturtze
October 13 – Kennie Steenstra
October 16 – Scott Davison
October 17 – John Mabry
October 18 – Doug Mirabelli
October 21 – Marc Wilkins
October 22 – Anthony Chavez
October 25 – Curtis King
October 25 – Terrell Lowery
October 27 – Pedro Swann
October 29 – Kerwin Moore
October 31 – Steve Trachsel

November
November 2 – Marcus Moore
November 5 – Glenn Dishman
November 5 – Javy López
November 6 – Chris Petersen
November 9 – Chad Ogea
November 11 – Jeff Ware
November 13 – Vic Darensbourg
November 16 – Héctor Fajardo
November 18 – Allen Watson
November 19 – Jeff Berblinger
November 19 – J. J. Thobe
November 23 – Glenn Murray
November 24 – Jason Jacome
November 29 – Steve Rodriguez

December
December 1 – Kirk Rueter
December 3 – Paul Byrd
December 5 – Andy Stewart
December 9 – Tony Tarasco
December 12 – Mike Buddie
December 15 – Robert Ellis
December 15 – Rick Helling
December 17 – Mike Cather
December 18 – Mike Gulan
December 19 – Tom Wilson
December 21 – John Hope
December 25 – Steve Montgomery
December 30 – Ben Blomdahl
December 30 – Bart Evans
December 30 – Chad Fairchild

Deaths

January
January 4 – Brad Springer, 65, pitcher who played from 1925 to 1926 for the St. Louis Browns and the Cincinnati Reds.
January 7 – Jumbo Elliott, 69,  pitcher for the St. Louis Browns, Brooklyn Robins, Philadelphia Phillies and Boston Braves between 1923 and 1934, who led the National League with 19 wins in 1931.
January 9 – Ray Collins, 82, pitcher for the Boston Red Sox from 1909 to 1915, who later coached at University of Vermont.
January 10 – Harvey Freeman, 78, pitcher for the 1921  Philadelphia Athletics.
January 12 – Doc Bass, 72, utility man who played for the 1918 Boston Braves.
January 12 – Andy Bruckmiller, 88, pitcher for the 1908 Detroit Tigers.
January 14 – Johnny Murphy, 61, general manager of the New York Mets from December 1967 until his death; formerly a standout relief pitcher for the New York Yankees for a dozen years between 1932 and 1946, who established the career saves record until it was broken in 1962; eight-time World Series champion: seven with Yankees as an active player, and one as GM of the 1969 "Miracle Mets".
January 15 – Bill Leard, 84, second baseman for the 1917 Brooklyn Robins.
January 17 – Alex Mustaikis, 60, pitcher for the 1940 Boston Red Sox.
January 18 – Jack Richardson, 77, pitcher who played from 1915 to 1916 with the Philadelphia Athletics.
January 21 – Casper Asbjornson, 60, catcher who played from 1928 to 1932 for the Boston Red Sox and Cincinnati Reds.
January 21 – Harry Shriver, 73, pitcher for the 1921-22 Brooklyn Robins.
January 23 – Bill Conroy, 71, infielder for the 1923  Washington Senators.
January 24 – Hal McKain, 63, pitcher who played for the Cleveland Indians and Chicago White Sox in all or parts of five seasons spanning 1927–1932.
January 25 – Harvey Grubb, 79, third baseman for the 1912 Cleveland Naps.
January 26 – Jim Haislip, 78, pitcher for the 1913 Philadelphia Phillies.
January 28 – Orie Arntzen, 60, pitcher for the 1943 Philadelphia Athletics.
January 29 – Miguel Fuentes, 23, Puerto Rican pitcher for the Seattle Pilots during the 1969 season, who was murdered in a bar fight in his home town of Loíza.

February
February 3 – Cool Turner, 68, infielder who played in the Negro leagues between 1921 and 1932; later an umpire in the Negro National League and head baseball coach of North Carolina College.
February 5 – Rudy York, 56, first baseman and seven-time All-Star who had six 100-RBI seasons for the Detroit Tigers and Boston Red Sox, while hitting a record 18 homers in one month as a rookie, and two grand slams in a 1946 game; coached for Red Sox (1959–1962), serving as Boston's interim manager for one game on July 3, 1959.
February 6 – Dick Mauney, 50, pitcher for the Philadelphia Athletics from 1945 to 1947
February 8 – John Churry, 69, reserve catcher for the Chicago Cubs who appeared in only 12 total games in four seasons (1924–1927).
February 13 – Paul Edmondson, 27, Chicago White Sox starting pitcher who went 1–6 (3.70 ERA) in 14 games in 1969; died in a car crash the day after his birthday.
February 16 – Dick Conger, 48, pitcher for the Detroit Tigers, Pittsburgh Pirates and Philadelphia Phillies between 1940 and 1943.
February 21 – Tom Carey, 63, infielder for the St. Louis Browns and Boston Red Sox between 1935 and 1946, later a coach with the Red Sox.
February 21 – Joe Shaute, 70, pitcher who won 99 games from 1922 to 1934 for the Cleveland Indians, Brooklyn Robins/Dodgers and Cincinnati Reds.
February 26 – Bill Bankston, 76, outfielder who played in 11 games for the 1915 Philadelphia Athletics; led minor leagues with 31 homers in 1914 during "Dead Ball Era".

March
March 3 – Bill McAllester, 81, catcher who appeared in 49 games for the 1913 St. Louis Browns.
March 6 – Bob Adams, 63, pitcher who worked in five games for the 1931–1932 Philadelphia Phillies.
March 11 – Bill Kerksieck, 56, pitcher who appeared in 23 games for the 1939 Philadelphia Phillies.
March 14 – Jim Levey, 63, shortstop for the St. Louis Browns from 1930 through 1933.
March 18 – John Misse, 84, shortstop for the St. Louis Terriers of the "outlaw" Federal League (1914).
March 18 – Frosty Thomas, 88, pitcher for the 1905 Detroit Tigers, who also collected 85 wins with the Minneapolis Millers of the Western League from 1902–1907.
March 20 –  Jack Flater, 86, pitcher for the 1908 Philadelphia Athletics.

April
April 2 – Dave Hoskins, 44, pitcher who won nine games for the 1953–1954 Cleveland Indians and the first African-American to play in the Double-A Texas League.
April 2 – Carl Ray, 81, left-handed pitcher who appeared in five games for the 1915–1916 Philadelphia Athletics.
April 7 – Ollie Voigt, 71, pitcher who worked in eight games for the 1924 St. Louis Browns.
April 8 – Lee Handley, 57, an infielder for the Pittsburgh Pirates (1937–1941 and 1944–1946), who also played with 1936 Cincinnati Reds and 1947 Philadelphia Phillies.
April 11 – Joe Heving, 69, a pitcher for the Giants, White Sox, Indians, Red Sox and Braves between 1930 and 1945, who led American League pitchers with 63 appearances in 1944, despite being the only grandfather playing in the majors.
April 11 – Sailor Stroud, 84, pitcher who posted a 5-7 record with a 3.25 ERA and three shutouts for the Detroit Tigers (1915) and New York Giants (1916).
April 12 – Red Shannon, 73, backup infielder who played from 1917 to 1921 with the Braves, Athletics, Red Sox, Senators and Cubs.
April 14 – Ed Crowley, 63, third baseman who appeared in two games for the 1928 Washington Senators.
April 14 – John Donaldson, 78, star pitcher in the Negro leagues, mainly with the All Nations team and Kansas City Monarchs.
April 15 – Ripper Collins, 66, All-Star first baseman who led NL in homers in 1934, then batted .367 in World Series, as a member of the St. Louis Cardinals' "Gashouse Gang."
April 16 – Mal Eason, 91, pitcher for the Chicago Orphans, Boston Beaneaters, Detroit Tigers and Brooklyn Superbas in the early 20th century.
April 17 – Dick Brown, 35, catcher who hit 62 home runs with 223 RBI in 636 games between 1957 and 1965 for the Indians, White Sox, Tigers and Orioles before his career was ended by brain cancer.
April 18 – Tony York, 57, infielder for the 1944 Chicago Cubs, and one of many major leaguers who only played during World War II.
April 20 – Ed Mensor, 84, outfielder for the 1912–1914 Pittsburgh Pirates.
April 20 – Jake Mooty, 58, pitcher who appeared in 111 games over seven years between 1936 and 1944 for the Cincinnati Reds, Chicago Cubs and Detroit Tigers.
April 25 – Gene Steinbrenner, 77, shortstop who played in three games for the 1912 Philadelphia Phillies.
April 25 – Earl Wolgamot, 77, longtime minor league catcher and manager who was a coach for the Cleveland Indians from 1931 to 1935.
April 26 – Yats Wuestling, 66, backup shortstop who played from 1929 to 1930 for the Tigers and Yankees.
April 30 – Chick Gagnon, 72, infielder who briefly appeared for the 1922 Detroit Tigers and 1924 Washington Senators.
April 30 – Dan Jessee, 69, who got into one game as a pinch runner for the 1929 Cleveland Indians.

May
May 2 – Art Delaney, 73, pitcher who appeared in 67 games over three seasons for the St. Louis Cardinals (1924) and Boston Braves (1928–1929).
May 3 – Cal Drummond, 52, American League umpire who worked in 1,369 league games from 1960 to 1969, the first of 1961's two MLB All-Star games, and the 1966 World Series; struck in the head by a foul ball on June 10, 1969, resulting in a blood clot to the brain, and died while attempting a 1970 comeback in the Triple-A American Association. 
May 9 – Ducky Yount, 84, pitcher who worked in 13 games for the Baltimore Terrapins of the "outlaw" Federal League (1914).
May 10 – Rufus Meadows, 62, pitcher who faced only one batter (and retired him) in his only MLB game for the 1926 Cincinnati Reds.
May 13 – Urbane Pickering, 70, backup infielder who hit .257 with 11 home runs and 92 RBI for the Boston Red Sox in the 1921 and 1922 seasons.
May 13 – Johnny Stuart, 69, pitcher who won 20 of 38 decisions for the 1922–1925 St. Louis Cardinals.
May 15 – Ed Gerner, 72, left-handed pitcher who appeared in five games for the eventual world champion 1919 Cincinnati Reds.
May 16 – Dutch Ruether, 76, southpaw pitcher who won opener of 1919 World Series for the world champion Cincinnati Reds after winning 19 games and posting the National League's best winning percentage (.760); won 137 MLB games for Chicago, Cincinnati and Brooklyn of the NL and Washington and New York of the American League, also contributing to three straight AL pennant-winners (1925 to 1927); member of the 1927 Yankees' World Series champions; later a scout for the New York and San Francisco Giants.
May 19 – Ray Schalk, 77, Hall of Fame catcher for the Chicago White Sox who was noted for his defensive brilliance, setting records for career games, putouts and double plays at the position.
May 21 – Jack Farmer, 77, infielder-outfielder who played in 62 total games for the 1916 Pittsburgh Pirates and 1918 Cleveland Indians.
May 21 – Les Fusselman, 49, catcher who played in 43 games for the 1952–1953 St. Louis Cardinals.
May 24 – Bill Lamar, 73, outfielder for the New York Yankees, Boston Red Sox, Brooklyn Robins and Philadelphia Athletics (1917–1927), who collected a .310 average including a .356 in 1925.
May 31 – Zip Zabel, 79, Chicago Cubs pitcher who set a major league record for the most innings pitched in relief in a game on June 17, 1915 against Brooklyn.
May 30 – Howie Gregory, 83, pitcher who made three appearances for the 1911 St. Louis Browns.

June
June 1 – George Watkins, 69, outfielder for the St. Louis Cardinals, New York Giants, Philadelphia Phillies and Brooklyn Dodgers in the early 1930s, who owns the major league season-record for a rookie with a .373 batting average.
June 3 – Jakie May, 74, relief pitcher for the St. Louis Cardinals, Cincinnati Reds and Chicago Cubs in 14 seasons spanning 1917–1932, who posted a 72–95 record with a 3.88 ERA and 19 saves in 1,562 innings of work.
June 14 – Webbo Clarke, 42, Panamanian pitcher who played for the 1955 Washington Senators.
June 23 – Ross Reynolds, 82, pitcher who posted a 5-4 record and a 2.62 ERA for the 1914–1915 Detroit Tigers.

July
July 1 – Herb Hall, 77, pitcher for the 1918 Detroit Tigers.
July 3 – Walter Briggs Jr., 58, owner of the Tigers from 1952–1956 and general manager from July 1956 to April 1957; his father was co-owner or owner of the team from 1919 until his January 1952 death.
July 7 – Harry Wolter, 85, outfielder and pitcher who played for the Cincinnati Reds, Pittsburgh Pirates, St. Louis Cardinals, Boston Red Sox, New York Highlanders/Yankees and Chicago Cubs.
July 8 – Jimmy Grant, 51, third baseman who played from 1942 through 1944 for the Chicago White Sox and Cleveland Indians.
July 15 – Emilio Palmero, 75, Cuban pitcher who spent over 17 years in baseball, including stints with the New York Giants, St. Louis Browns, Washington Senators and Boston Braves during five seasons spanning 1915–1928.
July 16 – Peahead Walker, 71, who had a distinguished minor league career as player and manager, and later became a prolific football coach with several collegiate squads as well as the CFL's Montreal Alouettes.
July 24 – Harvey Green, 55, pitcher who played for the Brooklyn Dodgers in the 1935 season.
July 25 – Herb Hunter, 74, utility IF/OF for the New York Giants, Chicago Cubs, Boston Red Sox and St. Louis Cardinals between 1916 and 1921.
July 27 – Whitey Platt, 49, backup outfielder for the Chicago Cubs, Chicago White Sox and St. Louis Browns in five seasons between 1942 and 1949, who was a member of the 1938 United States national team in the inaugural Amateur World Series played in England, and also served with the US Navy in the Pacific Theatre of World War II.
July 29 – Charley Moore, 85, infielder for the 1912 Chicago Cubs.
July 31 – Jimmy Conzelman, 72, NFL star, head coach, and member of its Hall of Fame who spent three seasons (1943–1945) in baseball as an executive with the St. Louis Browns of the American League.

August
August 2 – Mike Cvengros, 69, pitcher who played with the New York Giants, Chicago White Sox, Pittsburgh Pirates and Chicago Cubs in a span of six seasons from 1922 to 1929.
August 11 – Paul Gillespie, 49, catcher for the Cubs in the early 1940s, who hit home runs both in his first and last major league at-bats.
August 13 – Duke Cleveland, 53, outfielder for Cleveland, Jacksonville and Indianapolis of the Negro American League between 1938 and 1947; selected to the All-Star team in 1941.
August 14 – Charles Ruffin, 58, catcher for three Negro National League clubs—primarily the Newark Eagles—between 1935 and 1946; selected as an All-Star in his final season.
August 15 – Ray Bates, 80, third baseman for the Cleveland Naps (1913) and Philadelphia Athletics (1917).
August 16 – Kurt Krieger, 43, pitcher in three games for the St. Louis Cardinals (1949, 1951); one of three Austrian-born players to appear in MLB.
August 23 – Doc Gautreau, 69, second baseman who played from 1925 to 1928 for the Philadelphia Athletics and Boston Braves; later a longtime scout.
August 23 – Red Smith, 78, backup catcher for the Pittsburgh Pirates in the 1917 and 1918 seasons.
August 25 – Leo Moon, 81, pitcher for the 1932 Cleveland Indians.
August 26 – Eddie Rommel, 72, pitcher who won 171 games for the Philadelphia Athletics, and later worked 22 years as an American League umpire.
August 31 – Heinie Odom, 69, third baseman who went straight from the University to Texas campus to the 1925 New York Yankees; played one game (on April 22), singled off Hall of Famer Walter Johnson in his only at bat, and played two errorless innings in the field in what would be his only MLB appearance.

September
September 1 – Ben Spencer, 80, outfielder in eight games for the 1913 Washington Senators.
September 2 – Herbert Hill, 79, who pitched two innings in his only MLB game for the 1915 Cleveland Indians.
September 7 – Gene Ford, 58, who pitched in five total games, one with the 1936 Brooklyn Dodgers and four for the 1938 Chicago White Sox.
September 13 – Leon Riley, 64, longtime minor league outfielder and manager who appeared in four games for the 1944 Philadelphia Phillies; father of Pat Riley.
September 14 – Sam Lanford, 84, pitcher who worked in two games for the 1907 Washington Senators.
September 14 – Jimmie Long, 72, catcher who had a three-game trial with the 1922 Chicago White Sox.
September 15 – Blue Washington, 72, first baseman/outfielder/pitcher for the Chicago American Giants and Kansas City Monarchs (1916–1920) and prizefighter who became a prolific film actor in Hollywood; father of Kenny Washington.
September 16 – Ray Shook, 80, catcher who appeared in one game as a pinch runner for the 1916 White Sox.
September 17 – Ed Corey, 76, who pitched two innings in his only MLB game for the 1918 White Sox.
September 19 – Dave Danforth, 80, pitcher who posted a 71–66 record with a 3.89 ERA from 1911–1925 for the Philadelphia Athletics, Chicago White Sox and St. Louis Browns.
September 20 – Oliver Hill, 60, minor-league infielder who got into two games as a pinch hitter for the 1939 Boston Bees.
September 20 – Fred Lamlein, 83, pitcher in five MLB games, one for the 1912 White Sox and four for the 1915 Cardinals.
September 21 – Biggs Wehde, 63, pitcher who worked in 12 games for the 1930–1931 White Sox.
September 30 – Lou Novikoff, 54, outfielder who played in 356 games for the Chicago Cubs (1941–1944) and Philadelphia Phillies (1946); in the minors, a career .337 hitter in over 1,600 games who was elected to Pacific Coast League Hall of Fame.
September 30 – Hank Patterson, 63, catcher for the 1932 Boston Red Sox.

October
October 2 – George Mohart, 78, pitcher who played in 15 games for the 1920–1921 Brooklyn Robins.
October 5 – Reuben Ewing, 70, who appeared in three games for the 1921 St. Louis Cardinals as a pinch hitter, pinch runner and shortstop.
October 9 – Cy Fried, 73, pitcher in two games for 1920 Detroit Tigers.
October 10 – Lefty Leifield, 87, pitcher who averaged 17 wins for the Pittsburgh Pirates from 1906 to 1911, including a career-high 20 wins in 1907.
October 13 – Fred Mitchell, 92, Hall of Fame manager who won the 1918 National League pennant with the Chicago Cubs, and also was coach at Harvard University for 30 years.
October 22 – Cal Dorsett, 57, pitcher in eight games over three trials with the Cleveland Indians (1940–1941, 1947).
October 22 – Billy Sianis, 70[?], Chicago Tavern owner who took his pet goat to Game 4 of the 1945 World Series between the Chicago Cubs and Detroit Tigers, who was later ejected from Wrigley Field, thus putting an alleged curse in Cubs history.
October 23 – Sherry Robertson, 51, Canadian-born outfielder–infielder for ten seasons spanning 1940 to 1952 for the Washington Senators and Philadelphia Athletics who later became an MLB executive; brother of Calvin Griffith.
October 24 – Andy Oyler, 90, infielder–outfielder in 27 games for the 1902 Baltimore Orioles.
October 26 – Willie Underhill, 66, pitcher who worked in 15 games for the 1927–1928 Cleveland Indians.
October 28 – Wedo Martini, 57, pitcher in three games for the 1935 Philadelphia Athletics.
October 30 – Jimmy Welsh, 68, outfielder who batted .290 with 778 hits over six seasons (1925–1930) as a member of the Boston Braves and New York Giants.
October 31 – Johnny Lucas, 67, outfielder for the Boston Red Sox from 1931 to 1932.

November
November 2 – Bobby LaMotte, 72, shortstop and third baseman who appeared in 223 games for the Washington Senators (1920–1922) and St. Louis Browns (1925–1926).
November 3 – Red Kellett, 61, infielder who played in nine games for the 1934 Boston Red Sox.
November 5 – Dave Robertson, 89, outfielder who appeared in 804 games between 1912 and 1922 for the New York Giants, Chicago Cubs and Pittsburgh Pirates, who twice (1916–1917) led the National League in home runs.
November 5 – Charlie Root, 71, pitcher who won a club-record 201 games for the Chicago Cubs, best known as the pitcher that surrendered Babe Ruth's supposed "called shot" in the 1932 World Series.
November 5 – Freddy Spurgeon, 69, second baseman and third baseman who played in 316 games for the 1924–1927 Cleveland Indians.
November 7 – Johnny Hudson, 58, infielder who appeared in 426 games for the Brooklyn Dodgers (1936–1940), Chicago Cubs (1941) and New York Giants (1945).
November 7 – Paul McCullough, 72, relief pitcher who worked in three games for the 1929 Washington Senators.
November 8 – Ed Murray, 75, shortstop who played two innings of one game with the 1917 St. Louis Browns.
November 9 – Howard Maple, 67, left-handed-hitting catcher and pinch hitter who appeared in 44 games for the 1932 Washington Senators.
November 24 – Spencer Adams, infielder who was in 180 games (1923, 1925–1927) for the Pittsburgh Pirates, New York Yankees, Washington Senators and St. Louis Browns.
November 24 – Ivy Andrews, 63, pitcher for three American League teams from 1931–1938 and a member of the New York Yankees 1932 World Champions, who later became the first pitching coach for the Double-A Birmingham Barons.
November 25 – Gerald Nugent, 78, president and majority owner of the Philadelphia Phillies from 1932 to 1942.
November 28 – Orlie Weaver, 84, pitcher who won six games and lost 15 in 40 appearances for the Chicago Cubs (1910–1911) and Boston Rustlers, soon to be the "Braves" (1911).

December
December 5 – Joe Wyatt, 70, right fielder who played in four games for the 1924 Cleveland Indians,
December 10 – Marshall Renfroe, 34, left-handed pitcher who appeared in one game for the 1959 San Francisco Giants.
December 10 – Johnny Mostil, 74, center fielder for the Chicago White Sox (1918; 1921–1929) who appeared in 972 games, made 1,054 career hits, batted .301 lifetime, and twice (1925 and 1926) led the American League in stolen bases.
December 12 – Doug Taitt, 68, right fielder for the Boston Red Sox, Chicago White Sox and Philadelphia Phillies from 1928 to 1932, who later became a successful hitter and manager in the Minor Leagues.
December 13 – George Baumgardner, 79, pitcher who compiled a 38–49 (3.22) record in 124 games for the 1912–1916 St. Louis Browns.
December 13 – Chick Gandil, 83, first baseman for the Chicago White Sox (1910; 1917–1919), Washington Senators (1912–1915) and Cleveland Indians (1916), and the reported ringleader among the eight "Black Sox" players who threw the 1919 World Series.
December 14 – Herman Hill, 25, St. Louis Cardinals outfielder and former member (43 games) of the 1969–1970 Minnesota Twins; a drowning victim in Venezuela, where he was playing winter baseball.
December 14 – Walt Tragesser, 83, catcher who appeared in 272 games (1913; 1915–1920) for the Boston Braves and Philadelphia Phillies.
December 16 – Jim Winford, 61, pitcher who played in 68 games from 1932 to 1938 for the St. Louis Cardinals and Brooklyn Dodgers.
December 17 – Jim Park, 78, pitcher who worked in 42 games for the 1915–1917 St. Louis Browns.
December 19 – Charlie "Swamp Baby" Wilson, 65, shortstop and third baseman in 57 career games for the Boston Braves (1931) and St. Louis Cardinals (1933–1935).
December 19 – Nap Rucker, 86, who went 134–134 (2.42) in 336 career games (including 22 wins in 1911) between 1907 and 1916 for Brooklyn of the National League; during his decade with the team, it went through three nicknames: Superbas, Dodgers and Robins.
December 21 – Chubby Dean, 55, who appeared in 533 games in MLB as a pitcher, pinch hitter and third baseman for the Philadelphia Athletics and Cleveland Indians between 1936 and 1943.
December 25 – Red Juelich, 54, second baseman and third baseman in 17 games for the 1939 Pittsburgh Pirates.
December 26 – Jack Stansbury, 85, third baseman and center fielder who got into 21 games for 1918's eventual world champion Boston Red Sox.
December 28 – Doc Ozmer, 69, pitcher who worked two innings of only one big-league game as a member of the 1923 Philadelphia Athletics.

References

External links